Hui Chen is the Nomura Professor of Finance and a Professor of Finance at the MIT Sloan School of Management and a research associate at the National Bureau of Economic Research. Hui Chen is a co-editor of the Annual Review of Financial Economics.

Education 
Chen has a  B.A.  in economics and finance from Sun Yat-Sen University (Zhongshan University, 2000), an M.S. in mathematics from the University of Michigan (2002), and a Ph.D.  in finance from the University of Chicago (2007).

Career 
Chen is the Nomura Professor of Finance and a Professor of Finance at the MIT Sloan School of Management at Massachusetts Institute of Technology and a research associate at the National Bureau of Economic Research. 

Chen has served on the board of the Macro Finance Society. He is a co-editor of the Annual Review of Financial Economics and an editor of the Review of Asset Pricing Studies.

Research
Chen studies issues in  asset pricing and  corporate finance, including credit risk, financing, investment decisions,  liquidity, and the macroeconomy. He applies business cycle models to corporate financing and corporate bond pricing. He combines machine learning methods with finance theory and uses machine learning to develop robust algorithms for credit risk forecasting models and protect them against strategic attacks.  He is particularly interested in the behavior of Chinese financial markets.

Awards 
  2019, North America Arthur Warga Award for Best Paper in Fixed Income, Society for Financial Studies
 2011, Smith Breeden Prize/Dimensional Fund Advisors Prize, Journal of Finance, American Finance Association

References 

Living people

Year of birth missing (living people)
21st-century  Chinese  economists
University of Michigan alumni
University of Chicago alumni
Massachusetts Institute of Technology faculty
National Bureau of Economic Research
Annual Reviews (publisher) editors